The 1965 Milwaukee Braves season was the 13th and final season for the franchise in Milwaukee along with the 95th season overall. The Braves finished the season with an  record, 11 games behind the eventual World Series champion Los Angeles Dodgers. The Braves were managed by Bobby Bragan and played their home games at County Stadium.

It was the thirteenth consecutive winning season for the Braves, who never had a losing season during their time in Milwaukee. The final home game was on September 22 and the season's home attendance sank to  The franchise had attempted to move to Atlanta shortly after the  it was delayed  and the team relocated for the 1966 season.

The Milwaukee Braves compiled a 1,146-890 won-loss record for a .563 winning percentage in 2,036 games. They averaged 88.2 wins per season.

Milwaukee went four seasons without major league baseball (–); the expansion Seattle Pilots of the American League played just one season in 1969 and became the Milwaukee Brewers

Offseason 
 October 14, 1964: Phil Roof and Ron Piché were traded by the Braves to the California Angels for a player to be named later. The Angels completed the deal by sending Dan Osinski to the Braves on November 29.
 December 22, 1964: Bobby Del Greco was purchased from the Braves by the Philadelphia Phillies.
 Prior to 1965 season: Merritt Ranew was acquired from the Braves by the San Francisco Giants.

Regular season

Season standings

Record vs. opponents

Notable transactions 
 May 23, 1965: Lee Maye was traded by the Braves to the Houston Astros for Ken Johnson and Jim Beauchamp.
 June 8, 1965: Duffy Dyer was drafted by the Braves in the 38th round of the 1965 Major League Baseball Draft, but did not sign.
 July 21, 1965: Gary Kolb was traded by the Braves to the New York Mets for Jesse Gonder.
 August 5, 1965: Billy Cowan was traded by the New York Mets to the Milwaukee Braves for players to be named later. The Braves completed the deal by sending Lou Klimchock and Ernie Bowman to the Mets on September 25.
 September 1, 1965: The Braves traded a player to be named later to the Houston Astros for Frank Thomas. The Braves completed the deal by sending Mickey Sinnerud (minors) to the Astros on September 11.

Roster

Player stats

Batting

Starters by position 
Note: Pos = Position; G = Games played; AB = At bats; H = Hits; Avg. = Batting average; HR = Home runs; RBI = Runs batted in

Other batters 
Note: G = Games played; AB = At bats; H = Hits; Avg. = Batting average; HR = Home runs; RBI = Runs batted in

Pitching

Starting pitchers 
Note: G = Games pitched; IP = Innings pitched; W = Wins; L = Losses; ERA = Earned run average; SO = Strikeouts

Other pitchers 
Note: G = Games pitched; IP = Innings pitched; W = Wins; L = Losses; ERA = Earned run average; SO = Strikeouts

Relief pitchers 
Note: G = Games pitched; W = Wins; L = Losses; SV = Saves; ERA = Earned run average; SO = Strikeouts

Farm system 

Home games for spring training in Florida in 1965 were held at Municipal Stadium in West Palm Beach.

Notes

References 

1965 Milwaukee Braves season at Baseball Reference

Milwaukee Braves seasons
Milwaukee Braves season
Milwauk